Sandeep Baswana is an Indian actor.

Personal life
Baswana is in relationship with actress Ashlesha Sawant since 2004.

Career

Baswana made his television debut with the show Kuchh Jhuki Palkain and followed up with Kkoi Dil Mein Hai. As both shows were successful daytime serials, Baswana became noticed. However, it was his portrayal of the character Sahil Virani in the successful show Kyunki Saas Bhi Kabhi Bahu Thi that established his career and made him a household name. Since then Baswana has done several cameos in other shows playing supporting roles. He then played the role of Munna in Zee TV's Hitler Didi. In 2014, he appeared in television serial Udaan, where he portrayed the role of Ishwar Rawat. Currently, he is playing the role of Mandeep Brar in Dil Diyaan Gallaan.

Television

Films

 Haryana (film) as Director

References

External links
 

Male actors in Hindi television
Indian male television actors
Living people
Male actors from Haryana
People from Hisar district
Actors from Mumbai
1973 births